Victoria Jane Nuland (born July 1, 1961) also known as Toria Nuland
is an American diplomat currently serving as under secretary of state for political affairs. Nuland, a former member of the foreign service, served as the assistant secretary of state for European and Eurasian affairs at the United States Department of State from 2013 to 2017 and U.S. Permanent Representative to NATO from 2005 to 2008. She held the rank of career ambassador, the highest diplomatic rank in the United States Foreign Service. She is the former CEO of the Center for a New American Security, (CNAS), serving from January 2018 until early 2019, and is also the Brady-Johnson Distinguished Practitioner in Grand Strategy at Yale University, and a member of the board of the National Endowment for Democracy. She served as a nonresident fellow in the foreign policy program at the Brookings Institution and senior counselor at the Albright Stonebridge Group.

Early life and education 
Nuland was born in 1961 to Sherwin B. Nuland, a surgeon born to Eastern European Jewish immigrants, and a Christian British native mother, Rhona McKhann, née Goulston. She graduated from Choate Rosemary Hall in 1979. She earned a bachelor of arts degree from Brown University in 1983, where she studied Russian literature, political science, and history.

Career 

From 1993 to 1996, during Bill Clinton's presidency, Nuland was chief of staff to deputy secretary of state Strobe Talbott before moving on to serve as deputy director for former Soviet Union affairs. From 2003 to 2005, Nuland served as the principal deputy foreign policy adviser to Vice President Dick Cheney, exercising an influential role during the Iraq War. From 2005 to 2008, during President George W. Bush's second term, Nuland served as U.S. ambassador to the North Atlantic Treaty Organization (NATO) in Brussels, where she concentrated on mobilizing European support for the U.S. occupation of Afghanistan. In the summer of 2011, Nuland became special envoy for Conventional Armed Forces in Europe and then became State Department spokesperson.

In May 2013, Nuland was nominated to act as assistant secretary of state for European and Eurasian affairs and was sworn in on September 18, 2013. In her role as assistant secretary, she managed diplomatic relations with fifty countries in Europe and Eurasia, as well as with NATO, the European Union and the Organization for Security and Cooperation in Europe.

Ukraine 
Following the Maidan Uprising of 2013, Nuland stated that the United States had "invested" $5 billion to bring about a "secure and prosperous and democratic Ukraine."

On February 4, 2014, a recording of a phone call between Nuland and U.S. ambassador to Ukraine, Geoffrey Pyatt, on January 28, 2014, was published on YouTube.
 In their phone conversation, Nuland and Pyatt were having a discussion about who they thought should or shouldn't be in the next Ukrainian government and giving their evaluation of various Ukrainian political figures. Nuland told Pyatt that Arseniy Yatsenyuk would be the best candidate to become the next Prime Minister of Ukraine. Nuland suggested the United Nations, rather than European Union should be involved in a political solution in Kiev, saying that “So that would be great, I think, to help glue this thing and have the U.N. help glue it and you know ... fuck the EU”. The following day, Christiane Wirtz, Deputy Government Spokesperson and Deputy Head of the Press and Information Office of the German Federal Government, stated that German Chancellor Angela Merkel termed Nuland's remark "absolutely unacceptable." The president of the European Council, Herman Van Rompuy, condemned the remark as "unacceptable". Department of State spokesperson Jen Psaki said the discussion was not evidence of any American plan to influence the political outcome, remarking that "It shouldn't be a surprise that at any point there have been discussions about recent events and offers and what is happening on the ground".

Nuland was the lead U.S. point person for the Revolution of Dignity, establishing loan guarantees to Ukraine, including a $1 billion loan guarantee in 2014, and the provisions of non-lethal assistance to the Ukrainian military and border guard. Along with Secretary of State John Kerry and Secretary of Defense Ash Carter, she is seen as a leading supporter of defensive weapons delivery to Ukraine. In 2016, Nuland urged Ukraine to start prosecuting corrupt officials: "It's time to start locking up people who have ripped off the Ukrainian population for too long and it is time to eradicate the cancer of corruption". While serving as the Department of State's lead diplomat on the Ukraine crisis, Nuland pushed European allies to take a harder line on Russian expansionism.

During a June 7, 2016, Senate Foreign Relations Committee Hearing titled "Russian Violations of Borders, Treaties, and Human Rights", Nuland described U.S. diplomatic outreach to the former Soviet Union and efforts to build a constructive relationship with Russia. During her testimony, Nuland noted de-facto 2014 Russian intervention of Ukraine which she said, "shattered any remaining illusions about this Kremlin's willingness to abide by international law or live by the rules of the institutions that Russia joined at the end of the Cold War."

Trump administration 
Nuland left the State Department in January 2017, amid the departure of many career officials who left in the early days of the Trump administration.

On January 24, 2018, The Washington Post published an interview with Nuland where she opined on the work of President Donald Trump and Secretary of State Rex Tillerson. She described an exodus of career foreign service officials and dysfunction within the State Department, and stated that the American judiciary and media were under assault. Nuland also decried a trend towards American isolationism, stating: "When we withdraw and say it's every nation for itself, you open the door for countries dissatisfied with their territorial position and influence in the international system — or with the system itself." She encouraged whole-government responses to international issues, stating, "Military leaders would be the first to say military solutions alone result in more and longer military entanglements. The role of American diplomats and political leaders is to work concurrently with the military to bring to bear all of the political tools we have."

In January 2018, the Trump administration began new high-level engagements with Russian government officials by scheduling a meeting between Russia's top general Valery Gerasimov and the NATO Supreme Allied Commander Europe, General Curtis Scaparrotti. Nuland stated, "These channels are especially vital at a time when relations at the leader level are so unpredictable." She said Scaparrotti was "uniquely positioned" to address concerns about Russia's "ongoing military role in Ukraine, its INF treaty violations, its active measures to undermine Transatlantic democracies and the other strategic tensions that are driving the US and its allies to take stronger deterrent measures."

Biden administration

On January 5, 2021, it was reported that President-elect Joe Biden would nominate Nuland to serve as Under Secretary of State for Political Affairs under Secretary-designate Antony Blinken. Hearings on Nuland's nomination were held by the Senate Foreign Relations Committee on April 15, 2021. The committee favorably reported Nuland's nomination on April 21, 2021. On April 29, 2021, her nomination was confirmed unanimously  by the Senate by voice vote, and she started her work as Under Secretary of State on May 3, 2021.

Tenure

In July 2021 Nuland met with Belarussian opposition leader Sviatlana Tsikhanouskaya in Washington.

In March 2022, Nuland expressed concern that Russia would get control of Ukraine's biological research facilities during its invasion of Ukraine. 

Nuland visited Delhi in March 2022 and suggested that there was an "evolution of thinking in India". She said that the US and Europe should be "defense and security partners" of India, and that Russia's invasion of Ukraine presents a "major inflection point in the autocratic-democratic struggle".

At a United States Congressional hearing in early 2023, Nuland stated regarding the 2022 Nord Stream pipeline sabotage, "I am, and I think the administration is, very gratified to know that Nord Stream 2 is now... a hunk of metal at the bottom of the sea."

Personal life 
Nuland's husband, Robert Kagan, is a historian, foreign policy commentator at the Brookings Institution, and co-founder in 1998 of the neoconservative Project for the New American Century (PNAC).

References

External links

 Official biography  at the U.S. State Department
 Official biography at the U.S. State Department (2008 archive)
 Official biography at the U.S. NATO Mission website (2010 archive)

 C-SPAN Q&A interview with Nuland, June 18, 2006

|-

|-

|-

Under Secretaries of State for Political Affairs
Biden administration personnel
Center for a New American Security
United States Career Ambassadors
United States Department of State spokespeople
Permanent Representatives of the United States to NATO
Brown University alumni
American women ambassadors
20th-century American Jews
American people of Russian descent
American people of Ukrainian-Jewish descent
People of the Russo-Ukrainian War
People from Baker, Louisiana
Living people
1961 births
21st-century American Jews
American diplomats
American women diplomats